The Oklahoma Department of Career and Technology Education (ODCTE, commonly known and branded as CareerTech) is an agency of the state of Oklahoma located in Stillwater, Oklahoma.

CareerTech oversees a statewide system of career and technology education. The system comprises 29 technology center districts and 390 comprehensive school districts. CareerTech also has skills centers that serve state correctional facilities and a juvenile detention facility. The State Board of Career and Technology Education is the governing body of the department, composed of the Oklahoma State Superintendent of Public Instruction and eight members appointed by the Governor of Oklahoma with the approval of the Oklahoma Senate. The board appoints the director of Career and Technology Education, who serves as the chief executive officer of the department and serves as a non-voting member of the state board.

On February 1, 2015, Dr. Marcie Mack became the system's eighth state director.

Together with the Oklahoma State Department of Education and the Oklahoma State Regents for Higher Education, the department forms the core of Oklahoma's public education system.

History
The Oklahoma CareerTech System began with the passing of the Smith-Hughes Act of 1917 by President Woodrow Wilson. This act made available federal money for the promotion of vocational education. In 1929, the Division of Vocational Education was established as part of the State Department of Education. The department moved from Oklahoma City to Stillwater in 1932, and in 1941, the state legislature established the position of state director of vocational education. J.B Perky was the first director. In 1966, Oklahoma technology center school districts were formed, and in 1967, Tri County Tech became the state's first area vocational-technical school. On July 1, 1968, the Oklahoma State Board of Vocational and Technical Education was established as a separate entity from the State Department of Education. In 1971, the first delivery of training to inmates in a Skills Center at the Ouachita facility took place.

On May 19, 2000, Governor of Oklahoma Frank Keating signed House Bill 2128, which officially and immediately changed its name to the Department of Career and Technology Education.

Economic Impact
Recent Census Bureau survey data indicate that Oklahoma workers who have completed the equivalent of a two-year program with a vocational or occupational emphasis earned 20 percent more than workers with only high school diplomas the past two decades. These income gains can in turn contribute significantly to the overall level of income statewide. Over the work life, a typical career major completer can expect to add more than $475,000, or $188,000 in current dollars, to lifetime earnings relative to completing no additional education beyond high school.

In current dollars, the direct benefits are $1.84 billion in future income gains to completers, $138 million in added tax revenue to state and local government, and direct in-state spending of $185 million for the delivery of the career major instructional programs statewide. Indirect benefits include $1.66 billion in estimated spillover income gains to the broader state economy which in turn produce $124 million in tax revenue.

Leadership
The department is led by the state director and the CareerTech board. Dr. Marcie Mack serves as the state director.

Board of Career and Technology Education

The State Board of Career and Technology Education is a nine-member board composed of the Oklahoma superintendent of public instruction (who serves as the chairman of the board), two members of the Oklahoma State Board of Education, one member from each of the state's congressional districts and one at-large member.

All members, except ex officio members, are appointed by the governor of Oklahoma and confirmed by the Oklahoma Senate.

As of 2015, the chairman is Joy Hofmeister, Oklahoma superintendent of public instruction.

Current members include Major General Leo J. Baxter, Bill Price, Janet Smith, Dave Stewart, Philip Kennedy, Marilyn Harrel, Randy Gilbert and Tim Burg.

Organization
Board of Career and Technology Education
Director
All Agency Divisions
Accreditation
Business and Information Technology Education Division
Administration
Technology Engineering Division
Adult Basic Education
Family and Consumer Sciences Education Division
Adult Career Development
Trade and Industrial Education Division
Agricultural Education
Health Careers Education Division
Business and Industry Services
Business, Marketing and Information Technology Education
Career and Academic Connections
Communications and Marketing
Creative Services
Curriculum and Instructional Materials Center (CIMC)
Digital Printing, Distribution and Client Services
Education Partnerships and Customized Services
Facility Services
Family and Consumer Sciences Education
Federal Legislation Assistance
Financial Services
Health Careers Education
Human Resources
Information Commons
Information Management
Innovation, Research and Quality
Marketing Education
Partnerships and Customized Services
Professional Development
Program Management Office (PMO)
Research
Science, Technology, Engineering and Mathematics (STEM)	
Service Center
Skills Centers
Systems Design and Computer Services
Technology Engineering	
Testing	
Trade and Industrial Education

Hall of Fame
The Oklahoma Foundation for Career and Technology Education supports the Oklahoma CareerTech Hall of Fame. The award is given to individuals who, through their outstanding professional and personal achievements, have brought honor and distinction to career and technology education in Oklahoma.

Technology Centers
CareerTech Centers in Oklahoma provide career and technology education for high school students in the U.S. state of Oklahoma. An elected local board governs each technology center.

Autry Technology Center
Enid Campus
Caddo-Kiowa Technology Center
Fort Cobb Campus
Canadian Valley Technology Center
Chickasha Campus
El Reno Campus
Yukon Campus
Central Technology Center
Sapulpa Campus
Drumright Campus
Chisholm Trail Technology Center
Omega Campus
Eastern Oklahoma County Technology Center
Choctaw Campus
Francis Tuttle Technology Center
Portland Campus
Reno Campus
Rockwell Campus
Gordon Cooper Technology Center
Shawnee Campus
Great Plains Technology Center
Frederick Campus
Lawton Campus
Green Country Technology Center
Okmulgee Campus
High Plains Technology Center
Woodward Campus
Indian Capital Technology Center
Muskogee Campus
Sallisaw Campus
Stilwell Campus
Tahlequah Campus
Kiamichi Technology Center
Antlers Campus
Atoka Campus
Durant Campus
Hugo Campus
Idabel Campus
McAlester Campus
Poteau Campus
Spiro Campus
Stigler Campus
Talihina Campus
Wilburton Campus

Meridian Technology Center
Stillwater Campus
Metro Technology Center
Adult & Continuing Education
Aviation Career Campus
South Bryant Campus
Springlake Campus
Mid-America Technology Center
Wayne Campus
Mid-Del Technology Center
Midwest City Campus
Moore Norman Technology Center
Norman Campus
South Penn Campus
Northeast Technology Center
Afton Campus
Claremore Campus
Kansas Campus
Pryor Campus
Northwest Technology Center
Alva Campus
Fairview Campus
Pioneer Technology Center
Ponca City Campus
Pontotoc Technology Center
Ada Campus
Red River Technology Center
Duncan Campus
Southern Oklahoma Technology Center
Ardmore Campus
Southwest Technology Center
Altus Campus
Tri County Technology Center
Bartlesville Campus
Tulsa Technology Center
Broken Arrow Campus
Career Services Center
Lemley Campus
Peoria Campus
Riverside Campus
Sand Springs Campus
Training Center
Owasso Campus
Wes Watkins Technology Center
Wetumka Campus
Western Technology Center
Burns Flat Campus
Hobart Campus
Sayre Campus
Weatherford Campus

College Credit
Transcribed college credit is available for high school and adult students enrolled at CareerTech Centers through the Cooperative Alliance Program for certain technical courses. The Cooperative Alliances potentially save students time and money. The Cooperative Alliances are a partnership of CareerTech and the Oklahoma State Regents for Higher Education.

OSSM
The Oklahoma School of Science and Mathematics has 12 branches on CareerTech campuses with primary focus on the Calculus BC, Physics C and Mechanics AP Exams.

Student organizations
CareerTech is involved with several Career and Technical Student Organizations.

 Business Professionals of America (BPA)
 DECA (formerly Distributive Education Clubs of America)
 FCCLA (Family Career and Community Leaders of America)
 National FFA Organization (formerly Future Farmers of America)
 SkillsUSA
 Technology Student Association (TSA)
 Health Occupation Students of America (HOSA)
 National Technical Honor Society (NTHS)
 FIRST Robotics Competition (USFirst)

Skills Centers
The Skills Centers began operations in February 1971. The system began at the Jim E. Hamilton CareerTech Skills Center inside the Jim E. Hamilton (formerly Ouachita) Correctional Center at Hodgen, Oklahoma. Currently the CTSC has campuses in state correctional facilities and a juvenile detention facility.

Female

Eddie Warrior Correctional Center, Taft
Mabel Bassett Correctional Center, McLoud
Turley Residential Center, Tulsa 
	 
Male

Enid Community Correction Center, Enid
Howard McLeod Correctional Center, Atoka 
Jess Dunn Correctional Center, Taft
Jim E. Hamilton Correctional Center, Hodgen
Lawton Community Correction Center, Lawton
Lexington Correctional Center, Lexington
Oklahoma State Reformatory Work Center, Granite
William S. Key Correctional Center, Fort Supply
	
Juvenile 
	 	
Cedar Canyon, Weatherford

People
The CareerTech System has many notable graduates including governors, actors and a Miss America.

Jennifer Berry, Jenks DECA and FCCLA, Miss America 2006
Travis Brorsen, Perry FFA, actor and winner of Greatest American Dog
Gov. Brad Henry, Shawnee FFA, governor of Oklahoma
Elizabeth Kinney, Mooreland FFA, FCCLA, TSA, Miss Oklahoma 2004
Jason Meadows, Calera FFA, Nashville Star III runner-up
Kandinsky Holt, SkillsUSA, Miss Teen Oklahoma 2011

See also
Oklahoma Tech Prep
Oklahoma CareerTech Hall of Fame

References

External links
Oklahoma Department of Career and Technology Education
Oklahoma CareerTech Foundation

Government of Oklahoma
Governmental educational technology organizations
 
OK Cooperative Alliance
Public education in Oklahoma
Vocational education in the United States
1929 establishments in Oklahoma